Wine is a complex mixture of chemical compounds in a hydro-alcoholic solution with a pH around 4.
The chemistry of wine and its resultant quality depend on achieving a balance between three aspects of the berries used to make the wine: their sugar content, acidity and the presence of secondary compounds. Vines store sugar in grapes through photosynthesis, and acids break down as grapes ripen. Secondary compounds are also stored in the course of the season. Anthocyanins give grapes a red color and protection against ultraviolet light.  Tannins add bitterness and astringency which acts to defend vines against pests and grazing animals.  

Environmental factors such as soil, rainfall and fog affect flavor in ways that can be described collectively as "character" or the French term “terroir”. As climate change disrupts long-established patterns of temperature and precipitation in wine-growing regions and causes more extreme weather events, the rate at which sugars, acids and secondary compounds develop during the growing season can be disrupted. Hotter temperatures and an earlier growing season can push chemistry of berries towards higher sugar content, less acids and differences in aromas. Other factors such as smoke taint from fires can negatively impact chemistry and flavor, resulting in flaws and wine faults that can make the wines undrinkable.

Types of natural molecules present in wine 
 Acids in wine
 Phenolic compounds in wine
 Proteins in wine
 Sugars in wine
 Yeast assimilable nitrogen
 Minerals
 Dissolved gas (CO2)
 Monoterpenes and sesquiterpenes such as linalool and α-terpineol
 Glutathione (reduced and oxidized)

Volatiles 

 Methoxypyrazines
 Esters: Ethyl acetate is the most common ester in wine, being the product of the most common volatile organic acid — acetic acid, and the ethyl alcohol generated during the fermentation.
 Norisoprenoids, such as C13-norisoprenoids found in grape (Vitis vinifera) or wine, can be produced by fungal peroxidases or glycosidases.

Other molecules found in wine

Preservatives 
 Ascorbic acid is used during wine making
 Sulfur dioxide (SO2), a preservative often added to wine

Fining agents 
Gum arabic has been used in the past as fining agent.

List of additives permitted for use in the production of wine under European Union law:

Others 
 Melatonin
 Wine lactone
 Anthocyanone A, a degradation product of malvidin under acidic conditions

Wine faults 

A wine fault or defect is an unpleasant characteristic of a wine often resulting from poor winemaking practices or storage conditions, and leading to wine spoilage. Many of the compounds that cause wine faults are already naturally present in wine but at insufficient concentrations to adversely affect it. However, when the concentration of these compounds greatly exceeds the sensory threshold, they replace or obscure the flavors and aromas that the wine should be expressing (or that the winemaker wants the wine to express). Ultimately the quality of the wine is reduced, making it less appealing and sometimes undrinkable.<ref name="Baldy pg 37-39, et al">M. Baldy "The University Wine Course" Third Edition pgs 37-39, 69-80, 134-140 The Wine Appreciation Guild 2009 </ref>

The yeast Brettanomyces produces an array of metabolites when growing in wine, some of which are volatile phenolic compounds. Brettanomyces converts p-coumaric acid to 4-vinylphenol via the enzyme cinnamate decarboxylase. 4-Vinylphenol is further reduced to 4-ethylphenol by the enzyme vinyl phenol reductase. 4-Ethylphenol causes a wine fault at a concentration of greater than 140 µg/L. Other compounds produced by Brettanomyces that cause wine faults include 4-ethylguaiacol and isovaleric acid.

Coumaric acid is sometimes added to microbiological media, enabling the positive identification of Brettanomyces by smell.

Geraniol is a by-product of the metabolism of sorbate.

Fusel alcohols are a mixture of several alcohols (chiefly amyl alcohol) produced as a by-product of alcoholic fermentation.

 See also 

 Beer chemistry
 Food chemistry
 Premature oxidation
 Congener (alcohol), such as tryptophol

 Notes 

 References 
 Comprehensive Natural Products II — Chemistry and Biology, chapter 3.26 – Chemistry of Wine, volume 3, pages 1119–1172. Véronique Cheynier, Rémi Schneider, Jean-Michel Salmon and Hélène Fulcrand, 

External links

Wine Chemistry and Biochemistry, by M. Victoria Moreno-Arribas, Carmen Polo and María Carmen Polo, on Google books
Mass Spectrometry in Grape and Wine Chemistry, by Riccardo Flamini and Pietro Traldi, on Google books
Antoine de Saporta La Chimie des vins : les vins naturels, les vins manipulés et falsifiés'' (1889). Google Books